Tampico Alto is a town in the Mexican state of Veracruz. Located in the state's Huasteca Alta region, it serves as the municipal seat of the surrounding municipality of Tampico Alto.

In the 2005 INEGI Census, Tampico Alto reported a population of 2,126.

References

External links
Tampico Alto  Web page of the Veracruz State Govt. Retrieved 6 November 2008.

Populated places in Veracruz